Cosne may refer to three communes in France:

Cosne-Cours-sur-Loire
Cosne-d'Allier
Alligny-Cosne